Gabriel Gerasimi Kafian (1861, Shusha, Karabakh - 1930, Tbilisi) was an Armenian political and public activist, one of the founders of Social Democrat Hunchakian Party.

Biography
Kafian was born in the town of Shusha, in the Karabakh region of Elisabethpol Governorate. He finished Zurich University, in 1883 he participated in the Second International. In 1887, with Avetis Nazarbekian and others, he founded the Hunchak and the Social Democrat Hunchakian Party, the first socialist party in the Ottoman Empire and the Middle East. In 1889 he met Georgi Plekhanov and together with his group joined the Second International as a Hunchakian representative. In 1890 he moved to Constantinople, participated in the Kum Kapu Affray, then worked in Arabkir, Sebastia, Agn and Kharberd, where he formed revolutionary groups. He tried to include the Dersim Kurds in an anti-sultanic movement, but was arrested and jailed. After prison he lived in Europe. He was arrested again and transferred to Russian consul. In 1917 he participated in the February Revolution in Saint-Petersburg.

Sources
 The Armenian Question, encyclopedia, Ed. by acad. K. Khudaverdyan, Yerevan, 1996, p. 182.

Link
 Hunchakian party

1860 births
1930 deaths
Politicians from Shusha
Russian people of Armenian descent
Social Democrat Hunchakian Party politicians